Legislative Council elections were held in Mandatory Palestine in February and March 1923. However, due to an Arab boycott of the elections called by the fifth Palestine Arab Congress, the results of the election were annulled, and an Advisory Council was appointed instead.

Background
The Palestinian Legislative Council was established pursuant to Part III of the 1922 Palestine Order in Council, which was the constitution of the British Mandate. The Council was to consist of 23 members - 12 elected, 10 appointed and the High Commissioner. The ten appointed members were to be the Chief Secretary, the Attorney-General, the Treasurer, the Inspector-General of Police, the Director of Health, the Director of Public Works, the Director of Education, the Director of Agriculture, the Director of Customs and the Director of Commerce and Industry. Of the 12 elected members, eight were to be Muslim Arabs, two Christian Arabs and two Jews. Arabs protested against the distribution of the seats, arguing that as they constituted 88% of the population, having only 43% of the seats was unfair. The Muslim and Christian Arabs boycotted the elections.

Electoral system
Primary elections were held in February to elect secondary electors, who in turn were divided into electoral colleges for the purpose of electing Council members. All male citizens over the age of 25 had the right to vote. A total of 823 secondary electors were to be elected; 670 Muslims, 79 Jews, 59 Christians and 15 Druze.

Results
Whilst the election held between 20 and 28 February returned sufficient numbers of Druze and Jewish electors, only 82 electors were returned by Christian and Muslim Arabs. Voting was extended, but even after the additional period, only 126 Arab electors had been chosen.

Aftermath
After the elections results were annulled, a 12-member Advisory Council was established in May 1923. Its members were:
Bedouins
Fereih Middein (Beersheba)
Christians
Suleiman Bey Nassif
Anton Jallad (Jaffa)
Jews
Two members
Muslims
Raghib al-Nashashibi (Mayor of Jerusalem)
Aref al-Dajani
Ismail Bey Husseini
Abdul Fattah es Saadi (Mayor of Acre)
Amin Abd al-Hadi (Haifa)
Suleiman Bey Touqan (Nablus)
Mahmoud Abu Khadra (Mayor of Gaza)

References

External links
1922 The Palestine Order in Council UNISPAL

Mandatory Palestine
1923 in Mandatory Palestine
Elections in Israel
Elections in Palestine (region)
February 1923 events
March 1923 events
Palestine
Election and referendum articles with incomplete results